Starless and Bible Black Sabbath is an album and song by the Japanese group The Acid Mothers Temple and the Cosmic Inferno. The album's title refers to the album Starless and Bible Black by King Crimson and the band Black Sabbath, and, more specifically, their self-titled debut album. The album cover also is very similar to the self-titled Black Sabbath album, except featuring group member Kawabata Makoto instead of a woman on the album cover.

Overview
The song "Starless and Bible Black Sabbath" begins in a similar fashion to Black Sabbath’s eponymous opening track on their debut album, but less dramatic. The song grows slowly until a third of the way through the track vocals appear. The vocals have a large echo effect and there are two drummers playing virtually the same drum beat during a lot of the track, but with slightly different timing.

The second song, "Woman from a Hell" is a much faster and shorter track. As the song closes there is a Godzilla roar.

Track listing
 "Starless and Bible Black Sabbath" (Kawabata/Tabata) – 34:29
 "Woman from a Hell" (Kawabata/Tabata) – 6:14

Personnel
 Okano Futoshi - drums, Consultant
 Higashi Hiroshi - Synthesizer
 Shimura Koji - Drums
 Kawabata Makoto - Guitar, Producer, Engineer, Sound technician
 Tabata Mitsuru - Bass, vocals

References
 

2006 albums
Acid Mothers Temple albums
Alien8 Recordings albums